Philp is a surname, and may refer to:

Chris Philp (born 1976), British entrepreneur and Conservative Party politician
Douglas Philp (born 1967), Scottish chemist
Geoffrey Philp (born 1958), Jamaican poet, novelist and playwright 
Hugh Philp (1786–1856), Scottish golf club maker
James George Philp (1816–1885), English landscape and coastal painter
Peter Philp (1920–2006), Welsh dramatist and antiques expert
Robert Kemp Philp, (1819-1882), English chartist
Robert Philp (1851–1922), Scottish-Australian businessman and Premier of Queensland
Robert Philp (missionary) (1913–2008), Church of Scotland missionary in Kenya
Tom Philp (1923–1994), Scottish radiologist
Willie Philp, Scottish footballer

See also
 Philip (name)